Charles de Lalaing, baron and later 1st count of Lalaing, lord of Escornaix (1466 – Oudenaarde, July 18, 1525).

Life
Charles was born as the eldest son of Joost de Lalaing, from a family of landowners from Hainaut. He was married to Jacoba of Luxembourg, daughter of Jacob of Luxembourg and Maria of Berlaymont. Their children were:

 Jacob, died on 29 October 1512 at the siege of Maisières
 Charles II, 2nd count of Lalaing
 Philip, 2nd count of Hoogstraten
 Anna, died after 1602, married to Everard of Pallant, count of Culemborg

Political career
Charles was chamberlain to successively Maximilian of Austria, Philip the Fair and Charles V.

On 17 November 1505 he was made a Knight of the Order of the Golden Fleece (17th chapter, Middelburg).

From 1504 on he was governor of Oudenaarde. When Charles V spent six weeks at Charles of Lalaing's estates during the Siege of Tournai in 1521, he met Charles' servant Johanna van der Gheynst. As a consequence of the brief affair that ensued, the future regent Margaret of Parma was born.

1466 births
1525 deaths
Knights of the Golden Fleece
Ch